Kathleen Harrison (23 February 1892 – 7 December 1995) was a prolific English character actress best remembered for her role as Mrs. Huggett (opposite Jack Warner and Petula Clark) in a trio of British post-war comedies about a working-class family's misadventures, The Huggetts. She later played the charwoman Mrs. Dilber opposite Alastair Sim in the 1951 film Scrooge (US: A Christmas Carol, 1951) and a Cockney charwoman who inherits a fortune in the television series Mrs Thursday (1966–67).

Life and career
Born in Blackburn, Lancashire, Harrison was brought up in London, her father having become borough engineer for Southwark. She was educated at Clapham High School before training at the Royal Academy of Dramatic Art (1914–15). She spent some years living in Argentina and Madeira before making her professional acting debut in the UK in the 1920s.

Harrison made her stage debut as Mrs. Judd in The Constant Flirt at the Pier Theatre, Eastbourne in 1926. The following year she appeared in London's West End for the first time as Winnie in The Cage at the Savoy Theatre. Her subsequent West End plays included A Damsel in Distress, Happy Families, The Merchant and Venus, Lovers' Meeting, Line Engaged, Night Must Fall—also acting in the 1937 film version—Flare Path, Ducks and Drakes, The Winslow Boy and Watch It Sailor!.

She had already made her film debut with a minor role in Our Boys (1915), when she appeared in the film Hobson's Choice (1931). Another 50 films followed, including Gaslight (1940), In Which We Serve (1942) and Caesar and Cleopatra (1945), before making her name in later films.

Before and during World War II, she played small parts in numerous British films, including The Ghost Train (1941), Temptation Harbour (1947), and Oliver Twist (1948), and had a small but scene-stealing role as Mrs. Dilber in Scrooge (US: A Christmas Carol, 1951).

Harrison also played Kaney in The Ghoul (1933) and the matriarch in Mrs. Gibbons' Boys (1962), as well as two BBC productions of Charles Dickens's novels, Martin Chuzzlewit (1964) and Our Mutual Friend (1976). She later commented that Dickens was her favourite author. As her cinema appearances became more infrequent, Harrison turned to television. She starred on television as Mrs Thursday (1966–67), a charwoman who inherits £10 million and the controlling interest in a major company.

The Huggett family

The Huggett family made their first appearance in Holiday Camp (1947). Harrison played the London East End charwoman Mrs Huggett. The actress continued with the role, alongside Jack Warner as her screen husband, in Here Come the Huggetts (1948), Vote for Huggett and The Huggetts Abroad (both 1949), as well as a radio series, Meet the Huggetts, which ran from 1953 to 1961. Although disliked by critics, almost immediately it became one of the most popular programmes of its day. Harrison turned down the title role in writer Jeremy Sandford's Play for Today Edna, the Inebriate Woman (1971).

Harrison also starred with Warner in the film Home and Away (1956), about a working-class family that wins the football pools.

Personal life
Harrison married John Henry Back in 1916; the couple had three children, two sons, and a daughter. She always pretended to be six years younger than her age, but in 1992 she owned up to reaching 100 and received her telegram from the Queen. Harrison died in 1995 at the age of 103. She was predeceased by her husband, John, and a son.

Filmography

References

External links

1892 births
1995 deaths
Alumni of RADA
English film actresses
English television actresses
20th-century English actresses
People from Blackburn
English centenarians
Women centenarians